Jeanne Theoharis is a Distinguished Professor of Political Science at Brooklyn College.

Her book A More Beautiful and Terrible History; The Uses and Misuses of Civil Rights History won the 2018 Brooklyn Public Library Award for Nonfiction. Her book The Rebellious Life of Mrs. Rosa Parks won a 2014 NAACP Image Award and the 2013 Letitia Woods Brown Award from the Association of Black Women Historians.

Life

She graduated from Harvard University, and from the University of Michigan.
Her father is Athan Theoharis.

Works
Essays
Rosa Parks' Biography: A Resource for Teaching Rosa Parks
Theoharis, Jeanne, 2016. "MLK Would never shut down a freeway and 6 other myths about the civil rights movement and Black Lives Matter", The Root, July 15.
Theoharis, Jeanne, Burgin, Say, 2015. "Rosa Parks wasn't Meek, Passive or Naive--and 7 Other Things You Probably Didn't Learn in School,"The Nation, December 1. 
Marchevsky, Alejandra, and Jeanne Theoharis, 2006. Not working: Latina immigrants, low-wage jobs, and the failure of welfare reform. NYU Press.
Marchevsky, Alejandra, Theoharis, Jeanne, 2016. "Why It Matters That Hillary Clinton Championed Welfare Reform,"  The Nation, March 1.

Books

 

Editor

Jeanne F. Theoharis, Komozi Woodard, eds. Freedom North: Black Freedom Struggles Outside the South, 1940-1980, Palgrave Macmillan, 2003,

References

External links 

Jeanne Theoharis on the Melissa Harris Perry show. 

1969 births
Living people
Brooklyn College faculty
Harvard University alumni
University of Michigan alumni
American women political scientists
American political scientists
21st-century American biographers
American women biographers
21st-century American women writers
Historians of African Americans